Live in Manchester may refer to:
 Live From Manchester, a 2019 album by Blue October
 Live in Manchester (The Mutton Birds album), 1999
 Live in Manchester (Slash album), 2010
 Live in Manchester (Lisa Stansfield album), 2015